Dana L. Cloud is an American communication professor. Cloud's primary research focuses on rhetoric, cultural theory, gender theory, and queer theory. She is best known for her 1998 book Control and Consolation in American Culture and Politics: Rhetoric of Therapy in which she coined the term "rhetoric of therapy".

Early life

At Pennsylvania State University, Cloud received her B.A./B.S. English and telecommunications double major in 1986. Cloud received her M.A. in rhetorical studies from the University of Iowa in 1989. In 1992, she received her Ph.D. in Rhetorical Studies from the department of communication studies at the University of Iowa.

Career 
Cloud was a faculty member in the department of communication studies, part of the Center for Women's and Gender Studies and the Department of Rhetoric and Writing at the University of Texas in Austin, Texas, from January 1993 to August 2015. Cloud served as the director of graduate studies in department of communication Studies at the University of Texas, Austin, from August 2008–2015.

From August 2015 to May 2019, Cloud was a professor and the director of graduate studies at Syracuse University.

Cloud, who was a communications and rhetorical studies professor in the College of Visual and Performing Arts at Syracuse, is a supporter of the Boycott, Divestment and Sanctions (against Israel) movement and describes her views as radical liberalism. She has been named to various "blacklists" of professors during her career. In the Acknowledgements section of Reality Bites she acknowledges her "comrades" in the International Socialist Organization.

Research
Cloud’s research interests include critical rhetorical and cultural studies, including Marxist theory, feminist theory, public sphere theory, and postmodernism; the rhetoric of social movements; representations of sex, gender, and race in popular media; activist scholarship; and scholarship about activism.”

Control and Consolation in American Culture and Politics: Rhetoric of Therapy

Cloud is credited with creating the term “rhetoric of therapy” in her 1998 book, Control and Consolation in American Culture and Politics: Rhetoric of Therapy. In this book, she describes rhetoric of therapy as "a set of political and cultural discourses that have adopted psychotherapy's lexicon—the conservative language of healing, coping, adaptation, and restoration of previously existing order—but in contexts of social and political conflict." The book explores what occurs when political activism and the pursuit of social change is replaced by personal, psychological changes. Cloud credits this therapeutic shift in American culture to personal changes rather than social changes. In this book, Cloud argues that "the purpose of this therapeutic discourse is to encourage people to focus on themselves and their private lives rather than to attempt to reform flawed systems of social and political power."

We are the Union: Democratic Unionism and Dissent at Boeing

Cloud's 2011 book titled We are the Union: Democratic Unionism and Dissent at Boeing follows the 1995 assembly worker strike at aircraft maker Boeing. This case study follows union workers in Wichita and Seattle through their plea for union reform and the fight for a voice in corporate management. Presenting organizational communication and management communication theories, Cloud sheds light on each group involved – the corporate leaders, the assembly workers, and the union organizers. Cloud argues the importance of healthy unions and calls for union reform.

Reality Bites: Rhetoric and the Circulation of Truth Claims in U.S. Political Culture

Cloud's 2018 book titled Reality Bites: Rhetoric and the Circulation of Truth Claims in U.S. Political Culture intervenes in ongoing theoretical conversations about the limits of the epistemic in modern U.S. political culture. Cloud critiques the Left's use of uncritical “fact-checking” as a rhetorically neutral approach. Further, Cloud argues for a new method of judgment for truth claims which she calls rhetorical realism. Rhetorical realism assesses a truth claim's fidelity to epistemic knowledge, which she argues includes both scientific resources and the lived experience of the oppressed and exploited.

References

External links
 Profile at the University of Texas
 Profile at Syracuse University

American women writers
Critical theorists
Living people
Syracuse University faculty
University of Texas at Austin faculty
Year of birth missing (living people)
Pennsylvania State University alumni
University of Iowa alumni